The 2019–20 FC Akhmat Grozny season was the 11th successive season that the club will play in the Russian Premier League, the highest tier of association football in Russia.

Season events
On 3 June, Akhmat Grozny announced their first summer signing, with Konrad Michalak joining from Lechia Gdańsk on a four-year contract for an undisclosed fee. The following day, 4 June, Andrés Ponce also signed a four-year contract after joining from Anzhi Makhachkala.

After signing a new contract with Akhmat at the end of the 2018–19 season, Zaurbek Pliyev moved to Dynamo Moscow on 9 June, with young goalkeeper Aleksandr Melikhov signing a five-year contract from FC Tom Tomsk on 12 June.

On 14 June, Pavel Kaloshin joined Akhmat Grozny on trial from Anzhi Makhachkala.

On 29 June, Denis Glushakov signed a one-year contract with Akhmat Grozny, with the option of an additional year.

On 9 July, Idris Umayev moved to Khimki on a season-long loan deal.

On 23 July, Anton Shvets signed a new contract with Akhmat Grozny, keeping him at the club until the summer of 2023.

On 30 September, after a 2–0 away defeat to Sochi, Rashid Rakhimov resigned as manager, with Igor Shalimov being appointed as Rakhimov's replacement the same day.

On 7 December, Bernard Berisha signed a new contract with Akhmat Grozny until the summer of 2023.

On 7 January 2020, Vladimir Ilyin signed a 3.5-year contract with Akhmat Grozny.

On 14 January, Damian Szymański moved to AEK Athens on loan until the end of the season, with Maksim Nenakhov joining on a 4.5-year contract on 16 January from Rotor Volgograd.

On 16 January, Akhmat Grozny announced the signing of Felipe Vizeu on loan from Udinese until the end of December 2020.

On 31 January, Konrad Michalak left Akhmat Grozny to join Ankaragücü on loan for the remainder of the season.

On 11 February, Mikhail Gashchenkov joined SKA-Khabarovsk on loan for the rest of the season.

On 14 February, Miroslav Bogosavac joined from Čukarički on loan for the rest of the season.

On 17 March, the Russian Premier League postponed all league fixtures until April 10th due to the COVID-19 pandemic.

On 1 April, the Russian Football Union extended the suspension of football until 31 May.

On 15 May, the Russian Football Union announced that the Russian Premier League season would resume on 21 June.

With their contracts due to expire on 31 May, Yevgeni Gorodov, Roland Gigolayev, Oleg Ivanov and Denis Glushakov all extended their contracts with Akhmat Grozny on 29 May until the end of the 2019–20 season.

On 30 June, Akhmat Grozny agreed the permanent transfer of Damian Szymański to AEK Athens.

On 3 July, Akhmat Grozny announced the signing of Miroslav Bogosavac on a permanent transfer from Čukarički on a four-year contract.

Squad

On loan

Left club during season

Transfers

In

Loans in

Out

Loans out

Released

Trial

Friendlies

Competitions

Premier League

Results by round

Results

League table

Russian Cup

Squad statistics

Appearances and goals

|-
|colspan="14"|Players away from the club on loan:

|-
|colspan="14"|Players who appeared for Akhmat Grozny but left during the season:

|}

Goal scorers

Clean sheets

Disciplinary record

References

FC Akhmat Grozny seasons
Akhmat Grozny